Lime Street may refer to:

Places 
Lime Street, London, a street in the City of London, England
Lime Street (ward), a ward in the City of London
Lime Street, Liverpool, a street in Liverpool, England
Liverpool Lime Street railway station, the main station in the city of Liverpool, England
Lime Street, Sydney, a street in Sydney, Australia

Television 
Lime Street (TV series), a 1985 U.S. television series starring Robert Wagner and Samantha Smith

Other
Lime Street fire, a deadly fire in Jacksonville, Florida, and the subsequent test fires which demonstrated that arson investigators were wrong